State Route 127 (SR 127) is a 43.52 mile long north-south state highway in Middle Tennessee. It connects Decherd with McMinnville via Hillsboro and Viola.

Route description

SR 127 begins in Franklin County in Decherd at an intersection with US 41A/SR 16 at the northern edge of town. It goes northeast through farmland to have an intersection with SR 279 before crossing the Woods Reservoir/Elk River and entering Coffee County shortly thereafter. The highway then passes through wooded areas, where it passes by Arnold Air Force Base, before crossing over I-24, without an interchange, and entering Hillsboro. SR 127 then passes by several homes and businesses before having an intersection with US 41/SR 2. It then leaves Hillsboro and continues northeast through farmland and rural areas along the western edge of the Cumberland Plateau for several miles before crossing into Warren County. The highway continues northeast through rural areas to enter Viola and become concurrent with SR 108 at the southern edge of town. SR 108/SR 127 wind their way through town before leaving Viola and continuing north to have an intersection with SR 287. They then curve to the northeast and come to the southern outskirts of McMinnville, where SR 108 breaks off and continues north into the city while SR 127 continues northeast. The highway continues along the edge of the Plateau as it has intersections with both SR 56 and SR 8, both within less than a half-mile of each other. SR 127 then curves to the north again and crosses a bridge over the Collins River and continuing through farmland and rural areas before coming to an end at an intersection with SR 30, just approximately 1,300 feet east of US 70S. The entire route of SR 127 is a rural two-lane highway.

Major intersections

References

127
Transportation in Franklin County, Tennessee
Transportation in Coffee County, Tennessee
Transportation in Warren County, Tennessee